Republican Seismic Survey Center (RSSC) is the main organization, involved in the research and study of earthquakes on the territory of Azerbaijan Republic. Seismological, geophysical, geochemical and geodynamic complex researches are conducted in the center.

About the Republican Seismic Survey Center of Azerbaijan National Academy of Sciences 
RSSC is the only organization in the Commonwealth of Independent States (CIS), where the seismological researches are conducted by a network of seismic stations operating via satellite communication. This Seismic Stations Network produced by "Kinemetrix" company of the United States is widely used.

Currently, there are 35 seismic stations of RSSC operating via satellite communication on the territory of Republic. Five more seismic stations will be installed on land. The installation of 3 seabed seismic stations is planned in Azerbaijani sector of Caspian Sea for the first time in CIS. As the result of the installation of these stations, it will be possible to research both the tectonic processes in the sea and the impacts of these processes to oil fields and oil production.

History 

The history of the Republican Seismic Survey Center (RSSC) of Azerbaijan National Academy of Sciences (ANAS) has various historic stages. In Azerbaijan, the first instrumental observations began in the early 20th century.

In 1902, after a strong earthquake which occurred in Shamakhi, first supervision began with the initiative of Nobel brothers to establish 3 seismic stations, thereby the instrumental observations have been started.

The independent Seismological Service of Azerbaijan was restricted by the former Soviet Union for a long time.  By the decision of the Council of Ministers of Azerbaijan Soviet Socialist Republic in 1979 according to the decree of the National Academy of Sciences was created ”Geophysics” Geophysical Research Party at the Institute of Geology of ANAS.

In 1980 on its basis was founded Experimental Methodical Geophysics Expedition. The expedition was supervised by Arif Hasanov, the corresponding member of ANAS, doctor of geology-mineralogy sciences.

Since 2008, the corresponding member of ANAS, “Honoured Scientist”, the doctor of geology-mineralogy sciences, professor Yetirmishli Gurban Jalal headed the RSSC.  There was his exceptional services in the establishment and expansion of seismic monitoring network .

In order to improve the network of seismological observations and scientific research in the field of seismology, in 2009–2010 11 more stations were installed at Kinemetrics (Astara, Zardab, Kedabek, Khinalig, Altyagach, Kurdamir, Lerik, Zakatala, Mingechevir, Gazakh, Saatly). In 2011, the RSSC installed and commissioned more than 6 telemetric seismic stations (Gobustan, Gabala, Gusar, Ordubad, Shakhbuz, Heydarabad) and, thus, the number of seismic stations reached 31.

With the new system, the server's memory has been increased, and the latest version of Antelope 5.2-64 has been downloaded. The new system is used for processing earthquakes and other programs, creating a database and archiving. Apple computers are running the Mac OS X 10 operating systems.

To characterize the strength of the earthquake on the MSK-64 scale different signs are used: the extent of damage of buildings and structures, residual deformations in the soil, ground water regime changes, perceptibility concussion etc.

Macroseismic concussion analysis of the material makes it possible to estimate the intensity on a scale. As a result, constructed a schematic map of isolines is built and it reflects the geographical distribution of macroseismic implications. Subsequently, the results of macroseismic studies to determine the source parameters: its coordinates, depth, magnitude, direction, length, geometric parameters.

General director 
Gurban Jalal oglu Yetirmisli has been the general director of the Republic Seismic Survey Center since 2008.

Action 

Under the direction of scientific research of Republican Seismic Survey Center of Azerbaijan National Academy of Sciences is included:
The study of earthquakes kinematic and dynamic parameteres of seismicity on the territory of the Republic.
The complex research of geophysical and geochemical siesmo abnormal effects evidence in the structures and properties.
Geodynamic investigations (GPS).

Seismology 

Seismology is studying the seismicity on the territory of the republic, the kinematic and dynamic parameters of earthquakes. Seismological studies are carried out on the basis of a network of observations consisting of 35 telemetric seismic stations, the seismic regime of the territory of the republic, the distribution of earthquake sources, the dynamics of seismic processes in focal zones are estimated, the active sections of deep faults, the intensity of possible maximum earthquakes are identified. The mechanism of strong earthquakes is being studied, the seismic risk of large cities is estimated, and the seismicity of large construction sites is being investigated.
 

Earthquake Research Bureau
Department of macroseismic research
Department of Dynamics of earthquake sources
International Seismotomography Laboratory
 
 

In 2017, the International Seismotomography Laboratory was created at the Republican Seismic Survey Center of the Azerbaijan National Academy of Sciences (RSSC ANAS), operating in the Livermore National Laboratory of the United States and the Missouri University of Science and Technology.

Geophysics 

Geophysical studies include the analysis of seismoanomalous effects in variations of geomagnetic field intensity, non-tidal variations in gravity, and geodynamic studies.

Structure:
Department of Processing and Interpretation of Geophysical Materials
Department of technical control of geophysical equipment
Department of Magnetometry
Department of Gravimetry
Geophysical stations (6 stations).

Geochemistry 

Is studying the complex investigation  of  manifestation structure of the  seism abnormal effects in the geochemical areas the abnormal areas. In the seismoactice zones of the territory is being investigated the hidro-qas and radioactivity components of the geochemical areas. These works enables to valuate the self strength position of the seismic  zones and to reveal the  abnormal predictable  effects before M3 4.0 earthquake.

Representatives of the Oxford University of Great Britain - Professor Richard Walker and University researcher Ian Pearce, together with employees of the Republican Seismic Survey Center of ANAS, visited research sites in Shamakhi-Ismayilli district - Shamakhi, Aghsu, Ismayilli, Lahidj, Pirgulu, Goychay, as well as Salyan and Shirvan districts.
https://www.seismology.az/en/news/792#.Yac079LP2M8

Seismologic stations 

 Gabala seismic station  
 Zerdab seismic station 
 Agdam seismic station  
 Altiagach seismic station 
 Astara seismic station 
 Barda seismic station  
 Beylagan seismic station  
 Gadabay seismic station 
 Gala seismic station 
 Ganja seismic station 
 Gazakh seismic station 
 Gobu seismic station 
 Gobustan seismic station 
 Guba seismic station 
 Gusar seismic station 
 Heydarabad seismic station 
 Horadiz (Fuzuli) seismic station 
 Ismailli seismic station 
 Jalilabad seismic station 
 Khynalig seismic station 
 Kurdamir seismic station 
 Lankaran seismic station 
 Lerik seismic station 
 Mingachevir seismic station 
 Nakhichivan seismic station 
 Nardaran seismic station 
 Ordubad seismic station 
 Pirgulu seismic station 
 Saatly seismic station 
 Shahbuz seismic station 
 Shaki seismic station 
 Shirvan seismic station 
 Siazan seismic station 
 Yardimly seismic station 
 Zagatala seismic station

Enlightenment 

The RSXM carries out awareness-raising activities on earthquakes in the country and the rules of conduct during earthquakes. These measures are necessary due to the fact that the territory of Azerbaijan is located in a seismically active zone. For two years, the RSXC has been carrying out such awareness-raising activities by RSXM employees in secondary schools located in Baku and different regions of the country, as well as in construction companies.

Journal 

The scientific journal "Seismoprognosis observations in the territory of Azerbaijan" is published in English. The journal with international ISSN certificate is officially registered by the Higher Attestation Commission under the President of the Azerbaijan Republic. The editor-in-chief of the scientific journal is the general director of the RSSC ANAS, corresponding member of ANAS, professor Gurban Yetirmishli. Since 2019, the journal has been published twice a year. Articles published in the journal are based on feedback from local and foreign scientists and experts.

See also 
Classification of earthquakes
Qurban Yetirmişli

References

External links 
http://www.seismology.az 
http://www.science.gov.az/forms/organizatsii-pri-prezidiume/2459 

Seismological observatories, organisations and projects
1998 establishments in Azerbaijan
Organizations based in Baku